Xiuying is one district in Haikou City, Hainan. The district's total area is 512 square kilometers, and its population was 290,000 people in 2002.

Administrative regions

Xiuying district has jurisdiction over Xiuying Road and Haixiu Road. It also contains the small towns of Changliu, Xixiu, Haixiu, Shishan, Yongxing, and Dongshan.

External links
Xiuying District People's Congress 
Map of Xiuying District 

Township-level divisions in Haikou